Jennifer "Jenny" Wormald  HonFSA Scot (18 January 1942 – 9 December 2015) was a Scottish historian who studied late medieval and early modern Scotland.

Life
Jennifer (Jenny) was born in Glasgow on 18 January 1942, and was adopted by Margaret (née Dunlop) and Dr Thomas Tannahill, a general practitioner, and was then known as Jenny Tannahill.

She was educated at Glasgow High School for Girls, and went on to study history at the University of Glasgow, where she completed her PhD Her thesis was on the history of the late medieval Scottish nobility through analysis of a kind of document known as a bond of manrent.

Wormald taught at the University of Glasgow between 1966 and 1985, and then St Hilda's College, University of Oxford, between 1985 and 2005. She held a variety of other posts in this time, including Fellow Librarian and Senior Tutor at St Hilda's.

Her most important research was on bloodfeud in early modern Scotland, particularly in her article "Bloodfeud, Kindred and Government in Early Modern Scotland", which was highly influential. Wormald also produced a study of the reign of Mary, Queen of Scots. She was most recently an Honorary Fellow in Scottish History at the University of Edinburgh. Wormald was elected an Honorary Fellow of the Society of Antiquaries of Scotland on 30 November 2015.

She died in Edinburgh on 9 December 2015. She is buried in Dean Cemetery on the south side of the main entrance path.

Personal life
In 1963, Jennifer Tannahill married Alfred Lawson Brown. As Brown was a devout Roman Catholic, she converted to Catholicism when they married. They had one son and later divorced. In 1980 she married the historian Patrick Wormald, and together they had two sons. They divorced in 2001.

Select bibliography
 "Bloodfeud, Kindred and Government in Early Modern Scotland", Past and Present, 87 (1980).
 Court, Kirk and Community: Scotland 1470–1625. Edward Arnold. 1981
 reprinted Edinburgh University Press. 1991
 "James VI and I: Two Kings or One?", History, 68 (1983).
 "Gunpowder, Treason and Scots", Journal of British Studies, 24 (1985).
 Lords and Men in Scotland: Bonds of Manrent, 1442-1603. John Donald. 1985
 Mary Queen of Scots: a Study in Failure. George Philip. 1988
 2nd edition, as Mary Queen of Scots: Politics, Passion and a Kingdom Lost. George Philip. 2001
 (editor) Scotland Revisited. Collins & Brown. 1991
 (Editor & contributor), The Oxford Illustrated History of Scotland. Oxford University Press. 2005

References

20th-century Scottish historians
Academics of the University of Glasgow
Fellows of St Hilda's College, Oxford
British women historians
1942 births
2015 deaths
Scottish adoptees
Converts to Roman Catholicism
Fellows of the Royal Historical Society
People educated at the High School of Glasgow
Alumni of the University of Glasgow
Academics of the University of Oxford
Writers from Glasgow
Scottish women academics
Scottish Roman Catholics
21st-century Scottish historians